Rajendranath Barua (1913-2006) was an Indian politician. He was elected to the Lok Sabha, the lower house of the Parliament of India.

References

External links
 Official biographical sketch in Parliament of India website

India MPs 1967–1970
India MPs 1962–1967
Lok Sabha members from Assam
1913 births
2006 deaths
Indian National Congress politicians from Assam